Plesioclytus relictus is a species of beetle in the family Cerambycidae, the only species in the genus Plesioclytus.

References

Clytini